Nico Elvedi (born 30 September 1996) is a Swiss professional footballer who plays as a centre back for Bundesliga club Borussia Mönchengladbach and the Switzerland national team.

Club career
Born in Zürich, Elvedi was a youth player for FC Zürich. He made his Swiss Super League debut on 15 May 2014 in a 1–0 away win against FC Lausanne-Sport playing the full match.

Elvedi joined Borussia Mönchengladbach in 2015 for a €4 million transfer fee. He scored his first goal in the Bundesliga during the derby against 1. FC Köln. in 2017. The match saw Borussia Mönchengladbach win 1–0.

International career
Elvedi played for various Swiss youth teams, and made his debut for the senior Switzerland national football team in a friendly 1–2 defeat to Belgium on 28 May 2016.

He was included in the Switzerland national football team 23-man squad for the 2018 FIFA World Cup.

In May 2019, he played in 2019 UEFA Nations League Finals, where his team finished 4th.

In 2021, he was called up to the national team for the 2020 UEFA European Championship, where the team upset favorites France en route to the quarter-finals, where they lost to Spain.

In 2022, Elvedi was part of the Switzerland national football team's 26-man squad for the 2022 FIFA World Cup, where Switzerland were knocked out in the round-of-16 by Portugal, 6-1.

Personal life
Elvedi's twin brother, Jan, is also a professional footballer who plays for 2. Bundesliga club Jahn Regensburg.

Career statistics

Club

International

Scores and results list Switzerland's goal tally first.

References

1996 births
Living people
Footballers from Zürich
Swiss men's footballers
Association football defenders
FC Zürich players
Borussia Mönchengladbach players
Swiss Super League players
Bundesliga players
Switzerland youth international footballers
Switzerland international footballers
UEFA Euro 2016 players
2018 FIFA World Cup players
UEFA Euro 2020 players
2022 FIFA World Cup players
Swiss expatriate footballers
Expatriate footballers in Germany
Swiss expatriate sportspeople in Germany
Twin sportspeople
Swiss twins